José Luis Blanco Quevedo (born 3 June 1975 in Lloret de Mar) is a Spanish middle-distance runner, who mostly concentrates on the 3000 metres steeplechase.

Blanco won a silver medal in this event at the 2006 European Championships in Athletics. His personal best time is 8:12.86 minutes, achieved in Huelva in June 2006. He won the bronze medal in the steeplechase at the 2010 European Athletics Championships

International competitions

References

1975 births
Living people
Spanish male middle-distance runners
Spanish male steeplechase runners
Olympic athletes of Spain
Athletes (track and field) at the 2008 Summer Olympics
World Athletics Championships athletes for Spain
European Athletics Championships medalists
Doping cases in athletics
Spanish sportspeople in doping cases
Mediterranean Games silver medalists for Spain
Mediterranean Games medalists in athletics
Athletes (track and field) at the 2001 Mediterranean Games
Athletes (track and field) at the 2009 Mediterranean Games
21st-century Spanish people